Sheikh Sultan bin Muhammad Al-Qasimi (born 2 July 1939) is the sovereign ruler of the Emirate of Sharjah and a member of the Federal Supreme Council of the United Arab Emirates. 

He has ruled Sharjah continuously since January 1972, apart from a six-day period in June 1987, during an attempted coup led by his elder brother Sheikh Abdulaziz bin Mohammed Al-Qasimi.

Early life and education
Sultan's mother was Maryam bint Sheikh Ghanem Al Shamsi (1915–2010). He has four brothers and two sisters: Khalid, Sheikh Saqr, Abdul Aziz, Abdullah, Sheikha and Naema. 

In 1948, at the age of nine years, he enrolled in Eslah As Qasimia School. After completing his elementary and secondary education between Sharjah, Kuwait City and Dubai, Al-Qasimi went on to study a Bachelor of Science in Agricultural Engineering at Cairo University, graduating in 1971. He completed a PhD in history at Exeter University in 1985, and another in the political geography of the Gulf at Durham University in 1999.

Political career 
Sultan succeeded his brother, Khalid bin Mohammed Al Qasimi, as emir after his assassination on 25 January 1972. He was previously the minister of education for the Emirates.

In addition to those offices, he holds several educational posts. He became president of both the American University of Sharjah and the University of Sharjah in 1997 and was named a visiting professor at Exeter University, his alma mater, in 1998. He became a professor of modern history of the Gulf at the University of Sharjah in 1999. In 2008 he also became a visiting professor at Cairo University.

Sultan celebrated the 50th anniversary of his accession to the throne on 25 January 2022. He is the longest reigning Arab ruler, beating Qaboos bin Said's record of 49 and a half years,.

Honours and awards

Honours

National honour
 : Grand Cross with Collar of the Order of Zayed

Foreign honours
 : Grand Cross of the Order of Honour
 : Knight Grand Cross of the Order of Leopold
 : Grand Cross with Collar of the Order of the Republic
 : Commander of the Order of Arts and Letters
 : Grand Cross of the Order of Merit of the Federal Republic of Germany
 : Grand Cross of the Order of Merit
 : Sash of Honour

Honorary degrees and awards

 Honoris Causa in History; University of Coimbra, Coimbra, Portugal, October 2018
 Honorary Doctorate in Education and Cultural Relations; University of Calicut, Kerala, India; September 2017
 Honorary Doctorate in Social Sciences; Cairo University, Cairo, Egypt, May 2015
 Honorary Doctorate in Humane Letters; University of Paris Diderot, Paris, France; March 2012
 Honorary Doctorate in Political Science; Hanyang University, South Korea, September 2011
 Honorary Doctorate, Kanazawa University, Kanazawa, Japan; April 2010
 Honorary Doctorate in Humane Letters; American University in Cairo (AUC) Cairo, Egypt; February 2009
 Honorary Doctorate in Arts; University of Sheffield, Sheffield, UK; November 2008
 Honorary Doctorate in Administration; University of Jordan, Amman, Jordan; May 2008
 Honorary Doctorate in Philosophy, Tübingen, Germany; October 2006
 Honorary Doctorate; Armenian Academy of Science; Yerevan, Armenia; September 2005
 Honorary Doctorate in Administration; McMaster University; Hamilton, Canada; May 2004
 Honorary Doctorate in Laws; South Bank University; London, UK; April 2003
 Honorary Doctorate in Humane Letters; University of Edinburgh, Edinburgh, United Kingdom; 15 July 2001
 Honorary Doctorate in Philosophy; in Education; International Islamic University of Malaysia; Kuala Lumpur, Malaysia; February 2001
 Honorary Doctorate in History; The Eastern Studies Institute, Academy of Russian Studies; Moscow, Russia; 1995
 Honorary Doctorate in Arabic and Islamic studies; Exeter University; Exeter, UK; 1993
 Honorary Doctorate in Law; Khartoum University; Khartoum, Sudan; 1986
 Honorary Doctorate in Sciences; Faisalabad University, Faisalabad, Pakistan; April 1983

Personal life 
The Emir has had at least two wives. He was blessed with two sons, but he was fated to endure the death of both his sons. With his first wife, the Emir had two children:
Azza bint Sultan al Qasimi (daughter)
Mohammed bin Sultan Al Qasimi (1974–1999). He was the crown prince. He died after a heroin overdose at the Emir's residence in Wych Cross Place, near Forest Row, East Grinstead, UK, on 3 April 1999 at the age of 24 years. A state mourning period in Sharjah of seven days was observed and flags flew at half-mast. 
With his second wife, Jawaher bint Mohammed Al Qasimi, he had four children:
 Bodour bint Sultan (b. 1978), daughter. She is married to Sultan bin Ahmed Al Qasimi and has three children:
 Maryam bint Sultan Al Qasimi
 Ahmed bin Sultan Al Qasimi
 Alya bint Sultan Al Qasimi
 Noor bint Sultan (b. 1979), daughter
 Hoor bint Sultan (b. 1980), daughter
 Khalid bin Sultan (1980–2019), son. He was the owner of British clothing chain Qasimi. He died in London aged 39. His death was, according to the coroner, 'drug related' as 'toxicology tests revealed Khalid had high levels of GHB and "recreational" amounts of cocaine in his system'.

With reports of increasing drug abuse problems in the emirate, in May 2018 the emir announced the directive to establish the "Irada" drug addiction treatment and rehabilitation centre in Sharjah.

See also 

 Kalba

References

External links

1939 births
Living people
Sultan bin Mohamed
Alumni of Durham University
Alumni of the University of Exeter
Emirati autobiographers
Sultan bin Mohamed
Cairo University alumni
Academic staff of the American University of Sharjah
Academic staff of the University of Sharjah
Agricultural engineers
Commandeurs of the Ordre des Arts et des Lettres
Knights Commander of the Order of Merit of the Federal Republic of Germany
Recipients of the Bronze Wolf Award
Academic staff of Al Qasimia University
Recipients of orders, decorations, and medals of Sudan